The 1999–2000 season was Deportivo de La Coruña's 71st in existence, and 30th in La Liga.

Season review
Deportivo won their first ever Spanish league title with 69 points, five points ahead of Barcelona and Valencia, even after losing eleven matches.

In the UEFA Cup, Deportivo were eliminated in the Quarterfinals by Arsenal, and in the Copa del Rey at the round of 16 by Osasuna.

Deportivo began the season well, leading the league table by the 12th matchday and only losing three league matches by the midway point of the season in December, but lost form by the new year, only winning two of the following seven matches. However they regained form, winning seven of the next ten matches, and although Deportivo only won once out of the last 4 matches, they won on the last matchday against Espanyol to secure the league title, as Barcelona had dropped points by drawing their last two matches.

Squad
Squad at end of season

Transfers

Summer

In:

Out:

Winter

In:

Out:

Competitions

La Liga

Results by round

Matches

Copa del Rey

UEFA Cup

First Round

Second Round

Third Round

Quarterfinals

Statistics

Players statistics

Goal Scorers

Disciplinary record

References

Deportivo de La Coruña
Deportivo de La Coruña seasons
Spanish football championship-winning seasons